The 2002 Czech Figure Skating Championships were held in Karviná between December 7 and 9, 2001. Skaters competed in the disciplines of men's singles, ladies' singles, pair skating, and ice dancing.

Senior results

Men

Ladies

Pairs

Ice dancing

External links
 results

2001 in figure skating
Czech Figure Skating Championships, 2002
Czech Figure Skating Championships
2002 in Czech sport